Under Cold Blue Stars is the third album by indie folk musician Josh Rouse.  It was released in 2002 and was his last album for Slow River Records.

Track listing

 "Twilight" (Josh Rouse) — 0:28
 "Nothing Gives Me Pleasure" (Rouse) — 3:16
 "Miracle" (Rouse) — 3:58
 "Christmas With Jesus" (Rouse) — 4:14
 "Under Cold Blue Stars" (Rouse, Pat Sansone) — 4:26
 "Ugly Stories" (Rouse) — 5:26
 "Feeling No Pain" (Curt Perkins, Rouse) — 4:19
 "Ears to the Ground" (Jason M. Phelan) — 2:51
 "Summer Kitchen Ballad" (Rouse) — 2:59
 "Women and Men" (Rouse) — 5:06
 "The Whole Night Through" (Rouse) — 2:34

Personnel
Josh Rouse - guitars, vocals
Pat Sansone - bass, keyboards, vibes, guitars, percussion
Dennis Cronin - trumpet
David Henry - cello
Roger Moutenot - guitars, keyboards
Curt Perkins - loops
Darren Jessee - drums on 2, 3, 5, 6, 10
David Gerhke - drums on 4, 11
Marc Pisapia - drums on 7
Tony Miracle, Kip Kubin - programming on 5, 8
Mike Grimes - bass on 4, 11

2002 albums
Josh Rouse albums